Lewis Perley Fickett, Jr. (May 28, 1926 – May 17, 2016) was an American diplomat, educator, and politician.

Born in Winthrop, Massachusetts, Fickett graduated from Portland High School in Portland, Maine. He served in the United States Navy during World War II. Fickett graduated from Bowdoin College in 1947. He then received his law degree in 1952 from Harvard Law School. In 1956, Fickett received his doctorate from Harvard University. Fickett served in the United States Foreign Service and was stationed in Algeria, West Germany, and Washington, D.C. From 1963 until 2001, Fickett taught political science at the University of Mary Washington. He lived in Fredericksburg, Virginia. From 1975 to 1981, Fickett served in the Virginia House of Delegates and was a Democrat. Fickett died in a hospital in Fredericksburg, Virginia after a brief illness.

Notes

External links

1926 births
2016 deaths
People from Winthrop, Massachusetts
Politicians from Portland, Maine
Politicians from Fredericksburg, Virginia
Military personnel from Maine
Bowdoin College alumni
Harvard Law School alumni
University of Mary Washington faculty
American diplomats
Democratic Party members of the Virginia House of Delegates
Portland High School (Maine) alumni
American expatriates in Algeria
American expatriates in Germany